This is a history of Microsoft Office and its versions. This table only includes final releases and not pre-release or beta software.

Office versions

Summary

Microsoft Office 95

Microsoft Office 97

Microsoft Office 2000 

Microsoft Office 2000 Personal was an additional SKU, solely designed for the Japanese market, that included Word 2000, Excel 2000 and Outlook 2000. This compilation would later become widespread as Microsoft Office 2003 Basic.

Microsoft Office XP

Microsoft Office 2003

Microsoft Office 2007 

1 Office Customization Tool is used to customize the installation of Office 2007 by creating a Windows Installer patch file (.MSP) and replacing the Custom Installation Wizard and Custom Deployment Wizard included in earlier versions of the Office Resource Kit that created a Windows Installer Transform (.MST).

Microsoft Office 2010 

Remarks
1 Office 2010 Personal was made available for distribution only in Japan.
2 The retail version of Office 2010 Home and Student can be installed on up to three machines in a single household for non-commercial use only. The Product Key Card version only allows a single installation on a single machine.
3 The retail versions of Office 2010 Home and Business and Office 2010 Professional can be installed on two devices including a primary machine, and a portable device such as a laptop, for use by a single user. The Product Key Card version only allows a single installation on a single machine.
4 On February 1, 2012, Office 2010 University replaced the previous Office 2010 Professional Academic edition in an effort to curtail fraudulent product use.
5 Office 2010 Professional Plus is only available for Volume License customers. The retail version is offered through MSDN or TechNet.
6 The Office Customization Tool is used to customize the installation of Office by creating a Windows Installer Patch (.MSP) file, and replaces the Custom Installation Wizard and Custom Deployment Wizard included in 2003 and earlier versions of the Office Resource Kit. It is only available in Volume License editions.

Microsoft Office 2013 

Remarks

1 The Windows RT versions do not include all of the functionality provided by other versions of Office.
2 Commercial use of Office RT is allowed through volume licensing or business subscriptions to Office 365.
3 Windows Store versions are also available.
4 InfoPath was initially part of Office 365 Small Business Premium. However, it no longer is.

Microsoft Office 2016 
As with previous versions, Office 2016 is made available in several distinct editions aimed towards different markets. All traditional editions of Microsoft Office 2016 contain Word, Excel, PowerPoint and OneNote and are licensed for use on one computer. The installation of retail channels of Office 2016 is Click-To-Run (C2R), however volume licensing channels Office 2016 are using traditional Microsoft Installer (MSI).

Five traditional editions of Office 2016 were released for Windows:
 Home & Student: This retail suite includes the core applications only.
 Home & Business: This retail suite includes the core applications and Outlook.
 Standard: This suite, only available through volume licensing channels, includes the core applications, as well as Outlook and Publisher.
 Professional: This retail suite includes the core applications, as well as Outlook, Publisher and Access.
 Professional Plus: This suite available through MSDN retail channels and volume licensing channels, includes the core applications, as well as Outlook, Publisher, Access and Skype for Business. The deployment of this edition has C2R for MSDN retail channels and MSI for volume licensing channels.

Three traditional editions of Office 2016 were released for Mac:
 Home & Student: This retail suite includes the core applications only.
 Home & Business: This retail suite includes the core applications and Outlook.
 Standard: This suite, only available through volume licensing channels, includes the core applications and Outlook.

Mac versions

Office 98

Notes

References 

Microsoft Office
History of Microsoft
Microsoft Office